Sobor is a word in a Slavic languages that may refer to:

A synod in the Eastern Orthodox Church
A katholikon, a privileged type of church building in the Orthodox Church
Sobor, Hungary, a village
Zemsky Sobor, assembly of the land in the medieval Russia
The Cathedral (Honchar novel), or Sobor, a 1968 novel by Oles Honchar